Hans Ulrich Baumberger (7 April 1932 – 31 October 2022) was a Swiss entrepreneur and politician. A member of The Liberals, he served in the National Council from 1971 to 1975 and the Council of States from 1975 to 1983.

Baumberger died on 31 October 2022 at the age of 90.

References

1932 births
2022 deaths
Members of the Council of States (Switzerland)
FDP.The Liberals politicians
University of St. Gallen alumni
People from Appenzell Ausserrhoden